Troisdorf is a city in the Rhein-Sieg-Kreis (district), in North Rhine-Westphalia, Germany.

Geography
Troisdorf is located approximately 22 kilometers south of Cologne and 13 kilometers north east of Bonn.

Division of the city
Troisdorf consists of 12 districts (population as of April 2014):

 Troisdorf-Mitte (16,414 inhabitants)
 Altenrath (2,292 inhabitants)
 Bergheim (5,750 inhabitants)
 Eschmar (3,078 inhabitants)
 Friedrich-Wilhelms-Hütte (7,161 inhabitants)
 Kriegsdorf (3,129 inhabitants)
 Müllekoven (1,793 inhabitants)
 Oberlar (6,100 inhabitants)
 Rotter See (3,918 inhabitants)
 Sieglar (8,668 inhabitants)
 Spich (12,765 inhabitants)
 West (5,367 inhabitants)
 Total: 76,435 inhabitants

History
Troisdorf became a free city in 1952. In 1969, the urban area expanded with the annexation of the township of Sieglar and the villages of Altenrath and Friedrich-Wilhelms-Hütte (total population in 1969: about 51,000). The first large settlements in this area go back to the 9th and 10th century (Eschmar and Sieglar 832, Bergheim 987). The first churches in this area were built around 700 AD in Bergheim (St. Lambertus). 

Troisdorf is home to about 9,600 foreign nationals. The two most numerous foreign national groups are Turks (3,100) and Greeks (1,600). On June 4, 1972, Troisdorf founded the first advisory council for foreign citizens in Germany. In the years following the Peaceful Revolution and German reunification of 1989/1990 many migrants from Russia and other East European countries settled in Troisdorf.

Demographics
In April 2014, Troisdorf had a population of 76,435 according to official records. 11% of the population were foreign migrants.

Troisdorf has a predominantly Christian population: Roman Catholics, Protestants, Baptists, Jehovah's Witnesses and other Christian denominations, along with Muslim, Orthodox Christian and Jewish populations of non-indigenous origin. Troisdorf is one of the German cities whose mosque includes a minaret; it was built for the local Islamic community.

Mayors
 1969–1975: Josef Ludwig (CDU)
 1975–1993: Hans Jaax (SPD)
 1993–1998: Uwe Göllner (SPD)
 1998–1999: Walter Bieber (SPD)
 1999–2009: Manfred Uedelhoven (CDU)
 2009-2020: Klaus-Werner Jablonski (CDU)
 2020–incumbent: Alexander Biber (CDU)

Notable places
Europe's only picture-book museum is located in Troisdorf at the Wissem Castle.

Twin towns – sister cities

Troisdorf is twinned with:

 Évry-Courcouronnes, France (1972)
 Genk, Belgium (1990)
 Heidenau, Germany (1990)
 Redcar and Cleveland, United Kingdom (1990)
 Corfu, Greece (1996)
 Nantong, China (1997)
 Özdere, Turkey (2004)

Notable people
John Siberch (c. 1476–1554), pioneering printer and friend of Erasmus
Walter Stern (1896–1970), art critic and broadcaster
Paul Schäfer (1921–2010), cult leader, founder of Colonia Dignidad
Rupert Neudeck (1939–2016), humanitarian worker, founder of the Cap Anamur
Tom Buhrow (born 1958), news anchor
Sebastian Pufpaff (born 1976), comedian
Lena Schöneborn (born 1986), pentathlonist, Olympic champion
Sabine Lisicki (born 1989), tennis player
Mitchell Weiser (born 1994), footballer
Fabian Schiller (born 1997), racing driver

References

External links